Paul 'The Axeman' Martin was a DJ on the New Zealand rock music radio station called The Rock. It began in Hamilton and later moved to Auckland.  Over the years the station has been networked around New Zealand. The station  broadcasts rock music from "the '80s, '90s and now".

Career 

Martin was one of The Rock's longest serving jocks, presenting, programming and producing his weekly metal show The Axe Attack on the Rock since 1992.

He has interviewed Slayer, Metallica, Fear Factory, Sepultura, Megadeth, Anthrax, Suicidal Tendencies, Lita Ford, Deftones, Rob Halford, Steve Vai and Max Cavalera.

He writes for New Zealand music Rip It Up magazine as well as Australia's Tattoos DownUnder. Martin started his own record label "HELLMAN RECORDS" to promote New Zealand music. His first CD release The Axe Attack New Zealand Metal Vol.1 boasts 16 New Zealand metal acts.

Until early 2006 he was a DJ at Hamilton metal bar, 6 Feet Under.

Martin is still based in Hamilton in the Waikato and used to commute to Auckland on Sundays to do the Axe Attack live.

Affiliations 
Martin is a member of NZ's Heavily Tattooed Club.

Albums 
Martin has released albums with Knightshade and Blackjack and currently plays in a new agro metal band World War Four and Martin-skin. 
World War Four has supported notable acts such as Black Label Society, Down, Heaven and Hell, and Motorhead,
and opened New Zealand's 1st International Guitar Festival 2008 alongside Uli Jon Roth (Scorpions), Alex Skolnick (Testament),
Glenn Hughes (Deep Purple), Joe Satriani, Gilbey Clarke, Vernon Reid.

He also performs in The Fabulous Farrelli Bros with the rest of the Rock jocks and often pops up with cover band Head First.

In 2010, Martin joined New Zealand alternative metal band Devilskin as the band's bass player.

References

External links
 The Axe Attack Official Website
 The Rock Official Website
 World War Fours Official Website

New Zealand radio presenters
New Zealand songwriters
Male songwriters
New Zealand guitarists
New Zealand male guitarists
Living people
Year of birth missing (living people)